Yury Ivanovich Belyayev (2 April 1934 – 14 December 2019) was a Soviet football player and coach. A forward, he played in 111 matches for CSKA Moscow, scoring 52 goals. He was a member of the national team that won a gold medal at the 1956 Summer Olympics, but he did not play in any matches.

Belyayev came up in the youth system of CSKA Moscow but moved to Avangard Kolomna in 1952. He returned to the Red Army team in 1955 where he played for five seasons. Over that span, he was part of a squad that won the Russian Cup in 1955.

After retiring from playing, he became a coach. In 1966, he was named as a coach at CSKA where he spent one season. He returned to the coaching staff in 1982 for one season. From 1974 to 1980, he coached in the Soviet Armed Forces.

In 1991, Belyayev was honored as a Merited Master of Sport by the Soviet Union.

On 14 December 2019, Belyayev died at the age of 85.

References

1934 births
2019 deaths
Russian footballers
Soviet footballers
Association football forwards
Olympic footballers of the Soviet Union
Footballers at the 1956 Summer Olympics
Olympic gold medalists for the Soviet Union
Soviet Top League players
PFC CSKA Moscow players
Olympic medalists in football
Medalists at the 1956 Summer Olympics